Percy Hislop, also known as David Hislop (12 September 1870 – 1929) was a Scottish footballer who played as a forward in the Football League for Aston Villa.

He had earlier played in Scotland for Partick Thistle and Rangers, making an important contribution to the Govan club's first national championship in the inaugural 1890–91 Scottish Football League, playing in all of the 18 regular fixtures and scoring in the play-off against Dumbarton, a 2–2 draw which resulted in the title being shared between the clubs. He moved to England shortly afterwards, but having scored on his debut and been a regular member of the starting line-up for Villa at the start of the 1891–92 Football League season, he did not play for them again after October 1891, and the following year returned north with non-league Forfar Athletic.

References

1870 births
1929 deaths
Scottish footballers
English Football League players
Scottish Football League players
Aston Villa F.C. players
Rangers F.C. players
Partick Thistle F.C. players
Forfar Athletic F.C. players
Association football forwards